

Group A

Head coach:  Reinaldo Merlo

Head coach:  An Se-uk

Head coach:  Carlos Queiroz

1In 2002, it was revealed that Cao had in fact been born in 1968.

Head coach:  Maurice Setters

Group B

Head coach:  Ernesto Paulo Calainho

Head coach:  Martin Gbonke Tia

Head coach:  Alfonso Portugal

Head coach:  Ulf Lyfors

Group C

Head coach:  Les Scheinflug

Head coach:  Mohamed El Ezz

Head coach:  Gennadi Kostylev

Head coach:  Bertille St. Clair

Group D

Head coach:  David Burnside

Head coach:  Chus Pereda

Head coach:  Mahmoud Toughli

Head coach:  Juan José Duarte

References

External links
FIFA.com

FIFA U-20 World Cup squads